This list of LGBT writers includes writers who are lesbian, gay, bisexual or transgender or otherwise non-heterosexual who have written about LGBT themes, elements or about LGBT issues (such as Jonny Frank). Works of these authors are part of LGBT literature.

As this list includes writers from antiquity until the present, it is clearly understood that the term "LGBT" may not ideally describe the identity of all authors, particularly for those who wrote before the nineteenth century. In some cases, it is more useful to consider such authors as persons who expressed attractions for persons of the same sex (for example, Sappho or Plato), and avoid the anachronistic use of contemporary labels. Inclusion in this list follows general scholarly and academic norms, specified in references, that attempt to establish a genealogy or history of LGBT literature written by LGBT people. There are many additional non-LGBT authors who have written works on LGBT topics. All new additions to this list should include a reference.



A

B

C

D

E

F

G

H

I

J

K

L

M

N

O

P

Q

R

S

T

U

V

W

Y

Z

References

 
Writers
LGBT writers, list of

de:Portal:Homo- und Bisexualität/Themenliste/Literatur